Roshchinsky is a rural locality (a selo) and the administrative centre of Roshchinsky Selsoviet, Sterlitamaksky District, Bashkortostan, Russia. The population was 1,957 as of 2010. There are 18 streets.

Geography 
Roshchinsky is located 16 km north of Sterlitamak (the district's administrative centre) by road. Asavo-Zubovo is the nearest rural locality.

References 

Rural localities in Sterlitamaksky District